The 2004 Cup of Russia was the sixth event of six in the 2004–05 ISU Grand Prix of Figure Skating, a senior-level international invitational competition series. It was held at the Luzhniki Palace of Sports in Moscow on November 25–28. Medals were awarded in the disciplines of men's singles, ladies' singles, pair skating, and ice dancing. Skaters earned points toward qualifying for the 2004–05 Grand Prix Final. The compulsory dance was the Midnight Blues.

Results

Men

Ladies

Pairs

Ice dancing

External links
 2004 Cup of Russia

Cup Of Russia, 2004
Cup of Russia
Rostelecom Cup